Starfield COEX Mall (formerly known as COEX Mall), containing COnvention centers, EXhibition halls and many malls, is an underground shopping mall in Gangnam-gu Seoul, South Korea. The mall is located at Samseong-dong served by Samseong Station on Seoul Metro Line 2, at the intersection of Teheranno and Yeongdong Dae-ro. The COEX Mall is adjacent to the COEX Convention & Exhibition Center, which is part of the COEX complex, run by the Korea International Trade Association (KITA).

Along with hundreds of shops, the mall houses two food courts, MegaBox (cinema), COEX Aquarium and a large bookstore, but the Kimchi Fields Museum has moved to Insadong. It features a game area that is used to film computer game tournaments, which are broadcast on local television. There are stages inside and outside the mall for seasonal events and public appearances by celebrities. Millennium Square is the main exit of COEX Mall connecting with Line 2's Samseong Station.
Metro Seoul gimpo airport express line Bongeunsa station in the north.

History
The mall was originally developed by investments from the Korea International Trade Association. COEX Mall was designed by the US interior design company RTKL. COEX Mall was also designed by Gensler, under the theme "Unfolding Sky", emphasizing seamless flow and openness. Construction of the mall began on May 1997 and finished in April 2000.

In May, 2012, KITA (Korea International Trade Association) announced major renovation plans for the mall. It will spend  to the upgrade project. The renovation is needed to create passenger walkways between the new Bongeunsa Station on Seoul Subway Line 9, due for completion in 2014, with Samseong Station on Line 2. It was scheduled to start at the end of 2012 and complete by November 2014. The COEX complex renovation was completed on 27 November 2014.

Location
The COEX Mall is located at Seoul Gangnam-gu Yeongdong-daero 513(Samseong dong). This mall is connected the Samseong Station on Seoul Metro Line 2 and Bongeunsa Station on Seoul Metro Line 9. Chungdahm Station Line 7 is next to COEX Mall, as is World Trade Center Seoul.

Venues

Plazas 
The mall features five plazas: the Central Plaza, Live Plaza, Millennium Plaza, Asem Plaza, and Airport Plaza.

Byeolmadang library
The library has 50,000 books, 600 magazines, and offers e-books. In addition, it serves as an event center, intended to host talk shows with authors, lectures with intellectuals and personalities, and concerts.

Gallery

See also
Contemporary culture of South Korea

References

External links
 

Shopping malls in Seoul
Retail companies of South Korea
World Trade Center Seoul
Shinsegae Group
Tourist attractions in Seoul
Buildings and structures in Gangnam District
2000 establishments in South Korea
Shopping malls established in 2000
Gensler buildings